Eleonora Ricci (19 July 1924 – 16 April 1976) was an Italian actress.

Life and career
Born in Viareggio, Tuscany, Ricci was the daughter of actors Renzo Ricci and Margherita Bagni. Ermete Zacconi was her mother's stepfather. At 17 years old, she  moved to Rome to enroll in the Academy of Dramatic Arts, where she met Vittorio Gassman, who became her husband in 1944 and from whom she separated shortly after the birth of her only child, actress Paola Gassman (born June 1945), divorcing Vittorio in 1952 so he could marry Shelley Winters.

Ricci made her professional debut in 1943, in the theatrical company led by Laura Adani. During her career she was active on stage, radio, television and in films, notably working with Luchino Visconti, Pietro Germi, Liliana Cavani. She died after a long illness, aged 51.

Filmography

References

External links

1924 births
1976 deaths
20th-century Italian actresses
People from Viareggio
Italian film actresses
Italian stage actresses
Italian television actresses
Italian radio actresses
Accademia Nazionale di Arte Drammatica Silvio D'Amico alumni
Burials at the Cimitero Flaminio